New Serchhip is the northern extension of Serchhip Town in Mizoram State of India. It was created and inhabited since 1976. All Serchhip district administration's offices are situated here. The whole area is governed by a Mizo typical civic body called Village Councils.

History 

Assam Rifles has established their camp during the Mizo National Front uprising in New Serchhip area, since then the place is occupied. In 1976, the Village Council in Serchhip started to plan the whole village for residential area. Most of the district level Government offices also started to established within this area.

Demographic 

Christianity is the major religion in the village. Among the Christian denominations, Presbyterian has largest members with three local churches. Baptist, Pentecostal church, Catholic church, Salvation Army have good number of members. There are numerous construction laborers coming from Karimganj, Bihar and Bangladesh who are working in the village for a period of time.

Economy 

The main source of income is sustained by Government services. Mizoram Rural Bank has established its branch in Kudamkawn. Numerous roadside restaurants and grocery stores are available. Vegetable and meat market are established in College Peng and IOC Kawn.

Transport 

Town bus, taxi and auto-rickshaw are the major means of public transport. Daily maxicab services to Aizawl, Lunglei and Champhai are available. There is one Helipad in New Serchhip which connected Aizawl by Pawan Hans Helicopter service.

Education 

There are number of primary schools, two middle schools, two secondary/high schools, one Higher Secondary School and one undergraduate college. Literacy rate is almost 100%. Anganwadi centers contributed a lot in the literacy. Adult education programme also running smoothly.

Media 

There is one daily newspaper, named Zothlifim, published from the village. Numerous newsletters are published weekly or monthly by different churches and NGOs.

References 

Serchhip